The historic site Carhagouha (near Lafontaine, Ontario) is the Huron/Wendat name for the site of the first Catholic Mass celebrated in Ontario, Canada on August 12 (or June 24), 1615 by Fr. Joseph Le Caron (member of the Recollets order) in the presence of French explorer, Samuel de Champlain, and the Wendat.

Each year a Mass is celebrated to mark the anniversary. The exact place is not precisely known.

It was also the name of the village that Father Joseph Le Caron was staying in when Samuel de Champlain arrived in Huronia in 1615 to assist them in their war against the Iroquois.

Gallery

References

See also

Jesuit Missions amongst the Huron
Wyandot people
Sainte-Marie among the Hurons

First Nations history in Ontario
History of Simcoe County